Dr. Kent Nelson is a superhero appearing in American comic books published by DC Comics. The character first appeared in More Fun Comics #55 (May 1940) during the Golden Age of Comic Books and is the first character to use the name Doctor Fate.

While in an archaeological expedition with his father, Nelson accidentally awakens Nabu and kills his father in the process. Nabu takes pity on the boy and responds to the tragedy by training him to be an agent of the Lords of Order. Nelson eventually becomes a crime fighter and a chief defender of Earth from supernatural threats. A founding member of the All-Star Squadron and the Justice Society of America, Nelson would struggle with the revelation of Nabu's attempt to usurp control of his body with his spirit and his increasingly strained relationship with his wife. Over time in more recent stories and continuities, after having spent decades of acting as Doctor Fate, the character would also guide several of his successors, the most recent being his grandnephew Khalid Nassour. He would also serve as an advisor for Wonder Woman's incarnation of the Justice League Dark.

Nelson made his live-action debut in the television series Smallville, played by Brent Stait, and also appears in the DC Extended Universe film Black Adam (2022), played by Pierce Brosnan.

Publication history

Golden Age of Comics

Kent Nelson as Doctor Fate debuted in his own self-titled six page strip in More Fun Comics #55 (May 1940) during the Golden Age of Comic Books. The character was created by writer Gardner Fox and artist Howard Sherman, who produced the first three years of monthly Doctor Fate stories. After a year with no background, his alter ego and origins were shown in More Fun Comics #67 (May 1941). Fate's helmet was modeled after ancient Greek Corinthian helmets. shown by the shape and ear slots unique to the Corinthian helmet. His love interest Inza was known variably throughout the Golden Age as Inza Cramer, Inza Sanders, and Inza Carmer, which was amended to Inza Cramer in the Silver Age.

When the Justice Society of America was created for All Star Comics #3 (Winter 1940), Doctor Fate was one of the characters National Comics used for the joint venture with All-American Publications. He made his last appearance in the book in issue #21 (Summer 1944), virtually simultaneously with the end of his own strip in More Fun Comics #98 (July–August 1944).

Silver & Bronze Age of Comics
Aside from the annual JSA/JLA team-ups in Justice League of America that began in 1963, Doctor Fate appeared in other stories through the 1960s and 1970s, including a two-issue run with Hourman in Showcase #55–56, two appearances with Superman in World's Finest Comics (#201, March 1971 and #208, December 1971); an appearance with Batman in The Brave and the Bold (#156, November 1979); and a solo story in 1st Issue Special #9 (December 1975), written by Martin Pasko and drawn by Walt Simonson.

Doctor Fate and the rest of The Justice Society returned to All-Star Comics in 1976 with #58 for a two-year run ending with issue #74 and Adventure Comics #461-462 in 1978, and Adventure Comics #466 related the untold tale of the Justice Society's 1951 disbanding. Doctor Fate's origin was retold in DC Special Series #10, and Doctor Fate again teamed up with Superman in DC Comics Presents #23 (July 1980), and featured in a series of back-up stories running in The Flash from #306 (February 1982) to 313 (September 1982) written by Martin Pasko (aided by Steve Gerber from #310 to No. 313) and drawn by Keith Giffen.

Modern Age of Comics
Beginning in 1981, DC's All-Star Squadron elaborated upon the adventures of many World War II-era heroes, including Doctor Fate and the JSA. The series ran for 67 issues and three annuals, concluding in 1987. Doctor Fate made occasional modern-day appearances in Infinity, Inc. in 1984, the same year which witnessed the 22nd and final annual Justice Society/Justice League team-up. Doctor Fate also made a guest appearance in a 3-issue 1985 crossover in the pages of Infinity, Inc. #19-20 and Justice League #244. Doctor Fate then appeared in the four-part special America vs. the Justice Society (1985) which finalized the story of the Justice Society, featuring an elaboration of the events of Adventure Comics #466 and a recap of the Justice Society's annual team-ups with the Justice League.

In 1985, DC collected the Doctor Fate back-up stories from The Flash, a retelling of Doctor Fate's origin by Paul Levitz, Joe Staton, and Michael Nasser originally published in Secret Origins of Super-Heroes (January 1978) (DC Special Series #10 in the indicia), the Pasko/Simonson Doctor Fate story from 1st Issue Special #9, and a Doctor Fate tale from More Fun Comics #56 (June 1940), in a three-issue limited series titled The Immortal Doctor Fate.

Doctor Fate appeared in several issues of the Crisis on Infinite Earths, after which Doctor Fate briefly joined the Justice League.

A Doctor Fate limited series was released soon afterwards, which changed the character's secret identity. DC began a Doctor Fate ongoing series by J.M. DeMatteis and Shawn McManus in winter of 1988. William Messner-Loebs became the series’ writer with issue #25. The later issues of the series saw Kent's wife Inza take over as the new Doctor Fate. The series ended with issue #41. Following Zero Hour, DC killed off both Kent and Inza and replaced them with a new character, Jared Stevens.

In 1999, the revival of the Justice Society in JSA allowed the character to be reworked again. In addition to appearing in JSA, DC published a self-titled, five-issue limited series in 2003. The character was killed in the Day of Vengeance limited series in 2005 as part of the lead in to the 2005 company-wide event story, Infinite Crisis.

The Kent Nelson version of Doctor Fate was featured in the Dark Nights: Metal event.

Fictional character biography

Origin
Son of archeologist Sven Nelson, a young Kent Nelson went with his father on an expedition to the Valley of Ur. While exploring a temple discovered by his father, Kent opens the tomb of Nabu the Wise and revives him from suspended animation, accidentally releasing a poisonous gas which kills Sven. Nabu takes pity on Kent and teaches him the skills of a sorcerer over the next twenty years, revealing himself to be a Lord of Order who is the representative of order on Earth in a conflict between the Lords of Chaos and Order. Nelson is later given a mystical helmet, amulet, and cloak to become the hero known as Doctor Fate. Later accounts of his origin would revise certain details, with it explained as Nelson having learned much later in his life (before recounting this revelation to Inza). In these revised details, it was revealed that Sven's death was intentional on Nabu's part and instead of learning magic over the course of years, it was done in an instant from Nabu and was trained in a matter of days to wield the powers granted to him. Nelson also learned that Nabu was an exiled Lord of Order who sought a human host after Nabu's physical human body had deteriorated over the millennia fighting the forces of darkness and evil.

Immortal Doctor Fate 
After arriving back in the United States, Kent begins a career fighting crime and supernatural evil as the sorcerer and superhero Doctor Fate and sets up a base in a tower in Salem, Massachusetts. Kent also helps co-found the Justice Society of America in 1940. Kent would later switch to a half helmet in 1941 due to Nabu occasionally possessing him through the helmet. Kent also becomes a physician in 1942, later enlists in the U.S. Army and serves as a Paratrooper during World War II and resigns from the JSA in 1944 and becomes an archaeologist.

As a magic-wielding hero, Kent Nelson would first come into conflict with the enemy sorcerers and future nemesis known as Wotan, who would kidnap Inza Cramer as part of a plot to destroy Doctor Fate. Failing to kill Fate, Wotan fakes his death. Wanting to confirm his death, Kent would journey into the Underworld but discover Wotan's soul has not appeared in the realm of the dead, confirming that he still lived. As Doctor Fate, Nelson would later encounter an insane Wotan as he plots to use one of his scientific inventions to destroy the world by disrupting the world's electric field. Kent thwarts him and seals him away in suspended animated in an air pocked deep beneath the Earth.

Nelson would also encounter a powerful enemy in the form of Khalis, a mummy who was once a priest whom worshiped the Egyptian death god Anubis and the former owner of the Amulet of Anubis before Nabu defeated him and appropriated from him thousands of years ago. Khalis succeeds in regaining his lost amulet and beings working to please his master, who tasks him with killing Doctor Fate. With Inza's help in learning the true name of Khalis, Doctor Fate uses this knowledge and his magical powers to destroy Khalis and regains his amulet. Kent believed the battle to be a cosmic test by Nabu and is joined by Inza, who seemingly comes to terms with his double life.

Despite claiming to come to terms with his double life, Inza increasingly grows frustrated within the rift of her marriage with Kent Nelson caused by his missions as Doctor Fate and loneliness being within the Tower of Fate. As Kent fights against a powerful Lord of Chaos known as Totec (whose real name is Malferrazae and is based upon Xipa Totec), who was worshiped as  the Aztec God of War. Sensing Inza's jealousy of Nelson's role as Doctor Fate taking prescendence over her marriage with him, Totec using his powers to turn her jealously into a physical manifestation capable of battling Nelson, in which killing the creature also kills Inza. Meanwhile, Totec removes Fate into an alternate dimension and raises an undead army of his former worshipers, begins rebuilding Tenochtitlan, and plans to unleash a "Fifth Sun", a plan in which will exterminate all of humanity on Earth. However, Nelson succeeds in restoring Inza back to normal and defeats the physical manifestation of her jealousy and pushes his magical powers to the limit to undo the damage Totec caused and destroy the Lord of Chaos himself.

As Fate, Kent would later sense another looming threat in Iowa and investigates, coming across a red jewel embedded inside the ear of a corn and his approached by a farmer who demands he leave the property. He learns the farmer is deceptively powerful and encounters both Ynar and Vandaemon, the former being a rogue Lord of Order who grew disillusioned of the battle between the Lords of Chaos and Order and the latter being a Lord of Chaos from Gemworld who agrees with Ynar's conclusion. In the guise of the farmer, he sends Fate to another dimension to fight Vandaemon. Unbeknownst to Kent or Fate, Inza meets curator Vern Copeland of the Boston Museum of Natural History who claims to want to know more about Nelson's past excavation but truly wanted to meet Inza, whom he regarded as beautiful and saw in a photo. Vern attempts to seduce Inza and in a moment of weakness, she embraced the passionate kiss but ultimately rejects Vern. After incapacitating the Lord of Chaos, he attempts to reconnect into the Tower of Fate through Inza but learns she is not inside, fearing that her being outside the tower may induce insanity due to the magic of the Tower having actually slowed her aging and kept her sanity intact. As Fate battles Vandaemon and explore options of escaping, he is able to later forge a connection to Inza but senses her guilt and thoughts, with Fate assuming that she engaged in an extramarital affairs on account of their ongoing marital problems. Realizing this development is detrimental to Kent, Fate forges a connection and transports himself to Inza's location, incapacitating Vern in the process.

Regaining his autonomy, Inza begins questioning Kent on his reluctance to share what his true responsibilities entail and claims that she believes he doesn't trust her, not believing his claims that he doesn't remember much of his activities as Doctor Fate. Her claim of trust issues angers him and Kent reveals that he does recall her being in the presence of a man and Fate having picked up feelings of guilt and questions her on that. In a moment of anger, she slaps Kent but apologizes afterwards and leaves. Later, Kent becomes Fate, who begins understanding that the jewel he countered was the manifestation of Vandaemon's power and the farmer was instead a Lord of Order who banded together with Vandaemon. He also believes that much of the present strife between Kent and Inza was partially caused by their interference as Dr. Fate unwillingly supplied them with magical power from his being. Ynar reveals that he and Vandaemon intend to rule the universe themselves without influence from the other Lords of Chaos and Order. Inza later appears before Fate, wanting to see Kent one last time before the world may be destroyed by Ynar and Vandaemon's alliance. Fate would gain an epiphany, believing Inza's not being influenced by their magic and the Tower of Fate being remained unaltered (due to being Inza, Kent, and Nabu's dwelling) meant that the human spirit, containing both elements of order and chaos, is powerful enough to resist against their power. Fate forces a merging of himself, Kent, and Inza, granting them the power to defeat Ynar and Vandaemon. In its aftermath, Inza gains a deeper understanding of Kent due to the merging, convinced that the pair do not trust one another enough. Kent reassures her that the both of them will work out their issues.

Crisis on Infinite Earths
In the Crisis on Infinite Earths crossover, Doctor Fate is one of the numerous superheroes recruited by the Monitor to stop the Anti-Monitor. The event reveals that Doctor Fate's life and adventures is on one of the many parallel universes throughout the multiverse and the Anti-Monitor is a threat intended to become the sole ruler of realities. The Monitor intends to merge the multiverse into one, cohesive universe to make it strong but is killed by his protege, Harbringer, who is under Anti-Monitor's influence. Doctor Fate is later present as he and others attempt to piece the barrier separating the Earths. Doctor Fate is also later present as he along with other magic users lend their powers to the Spectre to confront the Anti-Monitor, although Spectre ultimately fails. Afterwards, Doctor Fate helps Amethyst, who has been blinded and transport her to Gemworld. In the aftermath of the series, despite the wide changes to various histories, much of Kent Nelson's history remained intact.

Doctor Fate (1987, 1988-1992) 
In the first miniseries, having been Doctor Fate for over forty years, Nelson's body has weakened and his battle with the Lords of Chaos began to wane his immortality spell (as well as Inza), making him capable of being killed. Several Lords of Chaos, such as Typhoon, take advantage of this as they attempt to kill Doctor Fate through the host. Nabu and Nelson are recalled back to the Lords of Order, who plead them to give up in order to let the kal yuga pass, in which will eventually place them back into power at the expense of the destruction of the universe by the Lords of Chaos. With Kent nearly dead from the burden of being Doctor Fate, both him and Nabu have no choice but to select his next successor, whom is revealed to be the enigmatic ten-year-old child, Eric Strauss, who possessed heightened senses and was aware of his destiny as an agent for the Lords of Order. Through Kent's body, Nabu ages the boy to adulthood. Unfortunately, Typhoon and his host, Dr. Benjamin Stoner, steal the Artifacts of Fate, corrupting them and Nabu's influence on Eric while draining Nabu's power from the artifacts. and becoming an evil version of Dr. Fate. Nelson helps Eric and Linda by realizing their role were to both be Doctor Fate together through a merger as it was supposed to be for himself and Inza, making Nabu accept this despite his protests. With the mantle of Doctor Fate successfully passing to Eric/Linda and their merger causing the Artifacts of Fate to be within them, Typhoon retreats and releases Dr. Benjamin Stoner through him. With the threat gone, Kent requests Nabu let him go, in which Nabu obliges. With Nelson dead, Eric and Linda Strauss become the official Doctor Fate. However, Kent Nelson's body would be used by Nabu shortly after, whom was cosigned to banishment from the Realm of Order due to his fellow Lords of Order believing him to be tainted by his experiences with humanity.

In the second series, while Kent Nelson was truly dead, Nabu continued to use Kent's name and body, coming to understanding humanity and feeling remorseful for his decade long manipulations of Kent and Inza. It is later revealed Nabu sent both Inza and Kent's soul into the Amulet of Anbuis, knowing that the afterlife within the amulet can craft the wishes of its dead inhabitants, allowing them to live the life they've always wanted peacefully. Eventually, both Kent and Inza are recalled back to the living to assume the role of Doctor Fate by Nabu, much to their chagrin, as Eric and Linda Strauss are killed. It is also revealed that Eric/Linda's connection spans from the fact that the two were reincarnated lovers in past lives and are able to assume the lives and identities of Wendy and Eugene DiBellia, an act unusual since their prior reincarnations lives were lived through infancy onward instead of assuming the lives of adults whom were fated to die.

Shortly after Kent and Inza are revived, the two acts as Dr. Fate by combining themselves into one being much like Linda and Eric. However, during a battle with renegade Lord of Order, Shat-Ru, whom was set on destroying the both of them for the legacy's failure to purify chaos from Earth, Kent is unable to become Dr. Fate alongside Inza and she accidentally traps Shat-Ru in Kent's old aging body once also used by Nabu. For a time, Inza acted as the sole Doctor Fate with Kent advising her. The two's relationships becames more strained as Inza's direction as a hero is more social and focused on superheroics whereas Kent feels Dr. Fate is best at dealing with only important matters of the supernatural as well as Inza's attempt at creating a utopia in their neighborhood in New York. The two also attempt to deal with having a more normal life in a time period foreign to them, Kent specifically working to becoming a teacher of Archaeology despite having lost his degree credentials, by showcasing his capabilities through Shat-Ru, in which Kent himself poses as his grandson while Shat-Ru poses as himself in his later years. Eventually, the two learn much of their strife and Inza's increasing insatability with her powers came from her patron, whom is revealed to be a Lord of Chaos, the eponymous Chaos. Chaos reasoned that even the Lords of Chaos aren't inherely evil and claimed he desired to make Inza a heroic Dr. Fate under his control although he also admitted to playing up their emotions for entertainment. Despite his initial hatred, Shat-Ru bonds with Kent and Inza, and helps the both of them defeat Chaos.

Eventually, through Shat-Ru, Kent becomes capable of being Dr. Fate on his own with similar powers although through the patronage of Shat-Ru and utilizing his old half-helm costume, simultaneously working alongside Inza as Doctor Fate.

Zero Hour
During the Zero Hour crisis, Kent and Inza merge into Doctor Fate. However, Extant uses his time-based powers to undo the magic that had kept the JSA young, which rapidly ages their bodies by several decades. The artifacts of Fate are also teleported back to Egypt, rendering Kent and Inza powerless. Realizing their time is short, the now elderly couple hunt down the smuggler Jared Stevens, who had recovered the helmet, cloak and amulet. Before they can transform into Doctor Fate once more, Kent and Inza are killed when their remaining life force is drained away by demons working for the villain Kingdom. Their souls then depart into the afterlife, leaving Jared to become the new Fate.

Blackest Night 
During the Blackest Night event, Kent is briefly resurrected as a member of the Black Lantern Corps.

The New 52 / DC You
Years after the Flashpoint crossover led to the retroactively rebooted continuity the DC Universe with The New 52, a newer version of Kent Nelson would appear during the DC You initiative. While still set within the new universe created from the New 52, the initiative was made to allow to emphasize storytelling over continuity. While Kent Nelson's first appearance in the fourth Doctor Fate series establishes him as the previous Doctor Fate to Khalid Nassour, much of his history remained unknown for a time.

Revised origin and early history
Earlier mentions of the character established him as Khalid Nassour's grandnephew and uncle of his mother, Elizabeth Nassour (related through an unnamed brother who was a preacher), whom was inspired into archaeology thanks to Nelson. Through Elizabeth's history, it is also expressed that Kent's brother (who fathered Elizabeth) and their grandfather both were Christian preachers. Other stories establishes this version's history to be similar to his previous version prior to Flashpoint; Nelson's origin is mostly intact, with added details such as Nabu's manipulation of Kent's father, Sven, having costed him most of his own life savings and status as a credible archaeologist. The story also revealed Kent was manipulated physically on an atomic level, created to have the mindset and physical body in Nabu's preferred image, a more grim expression of his manipulation in his life.

In the newly revised history in his superhero career, Nelson still encountered enemies such as Wotan and Khalis as well as having married Inza Cramer. Like his previous histories, his time as Doctor Fate still placed a burden on their marriage. Nelson also retained his history as a founding members of the JSA. Unlike his previous history, however, Nelson had gained a sidekick in the form of 10 year old Salem the Witch Girl, an inhabitant of Limbo Town (the homeworld of Klarion the Witch Boy). Immune from her "bad fates" curse bestowed to female runaways of Limbo Town, which subjected people Salem cared for to varying levels of bad luck that included death, she became Nelson's apprentice for a time until she began growing frustrated from being unable to free herself of her curse. After the curse nearly killed Inza Cramer (whom was Nelson's girlfriend at the time), Salem would disappear. Kent would then approach the Justice Society Dark for assistance but their combined effort proved insufficient in locating her. Nelson's memory of Salem would later be erased from his mind for reasons not yet known.

Doctor Fate (2015) 
In the final pages Prisoners of the Past storyline, Kent would appear, claiming to see Khalid when in reality, he has sensed him as the new Doctor Fate. Subquentionally in the Fated Threads storyline, Kent learns of Khalid's early adventures as the new Doctor Fate while explaining the reason for his reappearance: having abandoned the Tower of Fate and being Doctor Fate for years, he is suddenly drawned back to it when he senses a dark threat and an agent that can oppose it: Khalid. Additionally, Khalid pleads with Kent to take the helm back so he can resume his normal life, in which Nelson declines, believing this to be a divine calling. Using his power, he assumes his moniker of Doctor Fate alongside Khalid as they work to advert a disaster caused by a mischievous demon, Nelson also simultaneously beginning to mentor him as the dark looming threat he sensed nears. When mummies begin attacking Brooklyn, Nelson appears to dispatch them while investigating whom has reanimated them. Eventually, his investigation leads him to the source of the dark magic around Brooklyn the threat in which his premonitions warned him of: Osiris. Nelson is quickly dispatched by the ancient deity, whom is seeking Khalid for supposed transgressions against Anubis, unaware of the former's attempt at completely usurping his godly station. Awakening later, he witnesses Bastet and the archangels explain the misunderstanding to Osiris and upon doing so, the ancient deity allows Khalid to live.

DC Rebirth

Blue Beetle (2016) 
In the Blue Beetle: Hard Times storyline,  taking place at some point prior to the events of the Doctor Fate fourth series, Nabu later appears before Ted Kord, warning him that the Blue Beetle scarab is the result of magic and not alien technology as previously thought.  It is revealed through flashbacks that centuries ago, Nabu battled with Blue Beetle Scarab's intelligence, Khaji-Da, and nearly prevailed until the intervention of the Atlantean sorcerer, Arion, who was seemingly driven insane by his exposure to it (later revealed to be the instead the result of the Death Force infecting his mind), allowing the scarab to escape and resulting in Nabu trapping Arion. In the modern day, Kent Nelson is revealed to have been captured by Nabu and placed in some mystic stasis and preserving his body in the Tower of Fate, using him as some sort of anchor to the physical plane. When freed using his minions and an unsuspecting Nabu, Arion would defeat Nabu by severing the connection between the two characters, weakening Nabu by disallowing him to actively contribute and once more putting Nelson under stasis. Later, Terri Magus heals Nelson when she places the Helm onto him under the instruction of Nabu, the man now regaining control of his body. He later confronts Arion and helps Ted Kord and Jaime Reyes (Blue Beetle) defeat the sorcerer before trapping him within a coffin of imprison him within what is known as an "absolution crystal" for ten thousands years.

Dark Nights: Metal 
During the Dark Nights: Metal event, Doctor Fate assists the Justice League in defeating the Dark Nights. He forms a search team with Wonder Woman and Hawkgirl to find Nth Metal in the Rock of Eternity, where he is supposedly killed by Black Adam.

Justice League Dark (2017) 
Kent would make an appearance in the Justice League Darks "The Last Age of Magic" storyline, revealing to have to have since taken in Khalid as his apprentice to teach him the ways of magic in preparation of officially becoming a fully-trained Doctor Fate. After the events of Dark Nights: Metal and Justice League: No Justice storyline, Kent's body was subqentionally possessed by Nabu when he and Khalid decline to help him rid of magic by unleashing the Otherkind, a magical species that devour magic, having come to believe magic to be the source of the universe's problems. He would also turn Khalid into a vase and trap him within the Tower of Fate. When the newly established iteration of the Justice League Dark visit Kent and the Tower of Fate to ask Nabu information about the Otherkind, they learn that Nelson's body has been hijacked by Nabu and his young protege was since trapped for opposing his plan to rid the universe of magic. While in Kent's body, Nabu begins targeting locations of mystic significance and destroying them before meeting both John Constantine and Swamp Thing. The two attempt to thwart Nabu by calling upon their most powerful spells and abilities to attact the attention of more powerful beings to get them to intervene. Their attempts to fight Nabu attacts the attention of the Phantom Stranger, the ensuring conflict causing Nabu to seal away both Constantine and the Phanton Stranger inside the Helmet of Fate alongside the trapped soul of Kent Nelson.

In the "Lords of Order" storyline, the events that depict how Nelson came to be under Nabu's control once more; with the previous storyline having been stated to take place weeks before; after the emergence of the Tree of Wonder and the Otherkind, Nabu and Kent fiercely debate about how to react to this new revelation, where Nabu states his intentions of wanting to rid the universe of magic. Opposing his plan, he attempts to curb further discussion of it in front of Khalid. Later that night, Nabu controls Kent's body while he slept to force him to put the helm on and subjugate him totally. When Nabu later meets his Lords of Order brethren to further discuss their plan and Khalid is discovered, Kent uses all his willpower to prevent Nabu from using his body to cast a spell capable of killing his grandnephew. Unable to deal a killing blow, he instead turns Khalid into a vase to remove him. In the present time, directly after the Last Age of Magic storyline, Nabu and a band of the Lords of Order (having taken the bodies of various magic users as hosts) begin destroying various worlds connected to magic witin the Sphere of Gods and eventually set their sights on Myrra, the dimension protected by the Blue Devil and the Nightmaster, in which said title has since fallen to Detective Chimp. As Nabu and the Lords begin destroying Myrra, survivors begin retreating even as they are pursued. Wiping out Myrra, the Lords also arrive at Kor and bargains with members of the Justice League Dark and other prominent magicians to erase their minds and power of magic in return for their lives. As the Lords continue their plans, they are interrupted by Wonder Woman and Zatanna, whom were granted chaos magic and became the new Lords of Chaos alongside others. With Zatanna empowering a weakened Jason Blood with the Demon Three, they free Kent Nelson and those trapped in the helm. Nelson then helps seal Nabu away into the helm but changes the criteria for his hosts, requiring a willing bearer to become Doctor Fate. In the aftermath, Wonder Woman asks Kent Nelson to once more don the helm and act as a member of Justice League Dark. Having grown tired of the role and in light of Nabu's recent attack on the community, he declines and recommends Khalid instead, who declines on account of wanting to undergo further study and training before adopting the role. Instead, Nelson and Khalid agree to join the Justice League Dark as advisors.

The Witching Hour
Now a member of Justice League Dark, Nelson and team come into conflict with the Injustice League Dark, the super-villain counterpart of their team led by Circe, having gathered the power of Hecate for herself, and enlisted other well known super-villains' of magical origin: Klarion the Witch Boy, Papa Midnite, Floronic Man, and Solomon Grundy. As Circe begins converting magical power sources to herself and rewriting the "rules of magic" and reality itself, the team struggles to battle Circe within her newfound power and allies, losing Swamp Thing in the process. As Circe's plan comes to fruition of hijackings Wonder Woman's body and enlisting Eclipso alongside her cause and Kent is vulnerable to her power. In a desperate act to save the team from Circe and Eclipso, Khalid  reasons with Nabu and dons the helmet once more and turns the tide of the battle while the Lord of Order ceded his power to Kent's successor, allowing Wonder Woman the opportunity to barter Circe to be imprisoned in her own world with the power of Hecate residing within Wonder Woman.

Dark Nights: Death Metal
In the pages of Dark Nights: Death Metal, the event taking place between the Witching War and A Costly Trick of Magic storyline, Nelson's version of Doctor Fate was with Green Lantern, Flash, and Wildcat when they were shown to be guarding the Valhalla Cemetery. Later in the story, Nelson appears to fight the a magical version of Batman from the Dark Multiverse known as "Bat-Mage"

Justice League Dark: A Costly Trick of Magic
In the final storyline of the Justice League Dark title, Kent helps Khalid and the Justice League Dark in resorting order among the elemental forces of the DC Universe, re-convening a ritual known as the "Parliament of Life" which would balance out the elemental forces known as The Green, The Red, The Grey, and The Divided. Shortly after, Kent quits the team and reasons with Khalid that he wishes to experience normalcy in his life without the powers associate with Doctor Fate before embracing him and departs. When Khalid and the Justice League Dark later face the malevolent leader of the Otherkind, the Upside-Down Man, both Kent and Nabu appear as Khalid nearly passes out and takes his place in battle. Kent and Nabu began casting a spell capable of producing an attack strong enough to damage Upside-Down Man but it comes at the cost of a user's life force. As Khalid is unconscious, Nelson unleashes the blast and is killed as a result. While Upside-Down Man survives the blast, he is weakened enough for Zatanna to devise a means to ultimately defeat the entity. With Nelson dead, Khalid becomes the sole Doctor Fate incarnation albeit with a damage Helm of Fate from Nabu and Nelson's attempt.

 Infinite Frontier 
After the Justice League Dark: A Costly Trick of Magic and Dark Nights: Death Metal storylines, subsequent appearances of the character in stories take place prior to the character's depicted death in the final Justice League storyline, explaining various events in the character's previous history. In the Doomsday Clock limited series, Lois Lane is mailed a flash drive which contains newsreel footage of the Justice Society, including Doctor Fate. He was later seen with the Justice Society when Doctor Manhattan undoes the experiment that erased the Justice Society and the Legion of Super-Heroes.

 Justice Society of America: The New Golden Age (2022) 
In "The New Golden Age" one-shot, a younger version of Kent Nelson is showcased during the founding of the Justice Society of America in November 1940, with members such as Atom Smasher and Flash imploring Kent on their future. However, unlike prior depictions of the events, Nelson is instead shown a different vision of lost children accompanied by a Stranger before the helm overloads in power, causing him physical pain. As Green Lantern reassures they will face the threat together, Kent is instead disturbed that he cannot quite sense whom in question is causing this. Unknown to him during this time-frame, the Stranger's insertions of time includes also killing various incarnations of Doctor Fate in different timelines. Thirty-six years later, Doctor Fate is being in check up with Doctor Mid-Nite after having been injured during a battle with the super-villain, Vulcan, in the previous week. It is expressed that during the battle, Fate experienced visions of the future once more, seeing the same event he did in 1940 as well now remembering his sidekick Salem the Witch Girl and having memories of his death four decades later from his current time-frame. While speaking to Power Girl about the JSA's reluctance in legacies and the team supposedly preventing women from having prominence on the team, Nelson contends with it, expressing that both Wonder Woman was a longtime member of the team and that he himself is aware that eventually, a new iteration of the JSA will emerge with the inclusion of a new Doctor Fate. Thirteen years prior to the present time of the book, Doctor Fate encounters Catwoman as she steals the Shen Ring of Hauhet, informing her of its cursed abilities to drive others mad by seeing glimpses into the future. As Catwoman aims to use her whip to deprive Nelson of the helm, he experiences visions once more but this time can see the stranger having killed other incarnations of Doctor Fate throughout time. Disoriented from the experience, he warns Catwoman of then that her future daughter will be among the casualties of the Stranger when she joins the JSA decades from then, with Catwoman not believing him initially. One of the final panels of the issue that detailed the bios of the 13 missing Golden Age superheroes had a bio on Salem the Witch Girl who was revealed to have been Doctor Fate's sidekick until the day she vanished sometime after her Limbo Town curse nearly killed Inza Cramer.

When a version of Huntress from a possible future ends up in 1940 following a disastrous fight with Per Degaton, she meets the Justice Society of America as Doctor Fate tries to identify the threat that took out her makeshift JSA. This caused a magical backlash that caused Doctor Fate to experience a part of 1941 where she and Salem the Witch Girl found Mister Miracle fighting Solomon Grundy while Justice Society Dark members Zatara and Diamond Jack are having a spat. Upon ending up back in 1940 with the magical backlash knocking everyone down, Doctor Fate starts to ask Nabu what he isn't allowing him to see. Back in 1941, Mister Miracle has chained up Solomon Grundy as he suggests to Doctor Fate and Salem the Witch Girl that they should apprehend Bride of Grundy. Salem the Witch Girl then starts to ask Doctor Fate about her Limbo Town curse.

Powers and abilities
As a practicing sorcerer, Kent Nelson (as Doctor Fate) is often considered among the most powerful magic users in the DC Universe as well as among the most powerful incarnations of Doctor Fate; As Doctor Fate, Nelson has access to powerful talismans associated with its bearers. With the usage of specific mystic artifacts provided by his mentor, Nabu, he is considered nearly unstoppable in battle and nearly unmatched in spell-casting. In more recent versions of the character, Nelson's connection to Nabu's talismans (Artifacts of Fate) is intimate enough to draw power from a distance, granting him the ability to conjure a powerful facsimile of them and use their powers without having the Helm of Fate on him physically.

The character is depicted as having some rudimentary powers on his own due to alterations made by Nabu, granting him a level of near-invulnerability and longevity (referred to as immortality). Other alterations Nabu made include raising his body to it's mental and physical peak and (in later revisions) granted him all the arcane lore and magical knowledge Nabu possessed In most versions, the character is also regarded as a  brilliant archaeologist and earned a doctorate degree in the field. In his earlier appearance, the character was also a physician, having worked to earning a medical doctorate degree and was skilled practitioner of jujutsu.

 Mystical artifacts 
Nelson possess powerful artifacts, derived much from Nabu and granting him a wide breadth of power. However, the depiction of the assoicated artifacts and it's power changed overtime. Because of this, some abilities of the helm arent exhibited in all other incarnations of Doctor Fate. 

 Helmet of Fate 
Prior to Flashpoint, the helmet was depicting as granting Kent Nelson the majority of his powerful magical abilities through his patronage to Nabu, the character having revealed that as Doctor Fate, he could either choose to cast spells or create magical effects through his imagination, describing the helm as making him a "Earth-bound Lord of Order". Additionally, the helm allowed him to combine his form with another chosen vessel of Fate, creating a Doctor Fate entity more powerful with the two combined. The entity is also at it's most powerful when both hosts are male and female respectively. The helm also possesses a safeguard, capable of incapacitating potential usurpers or enemies who seek to use the helm for darker purposes. However, the helm also made him subseptible to possession by Nabu. While having the helm, the character remarked he could not totally recall events taking place while acting as Doctor Fate, remembering mostly key moments. 

After the New 52 onward, the helm is said to instead grant numerous powers including: spell-casting, flight, healing, the and the power to manipulate the natural elements (wind, earth, water, fire, and lightning). It is also stated that the helm can also fuel it's magical power through the elements. Despite this, however, it is unclear if Nelson utilized these specific abilities as Doctor Fate (as Khalid, the current version, was given these abilities partially due to the Egyptian god's connection instead of Nabu.).  

Witihn his appearances in Justice League Dark, Nelson's abilities with the Helm of Fate are more reminiscient of his prior portrayals, including the ability to power to trap entities within its separate world and was capable of having his will usurped by Nabu once more, implying earlier abilities being more exclusive to Khalid. He can also view different timelines of individual across the DC Multiverse, be it willingly or unwillingly, through Nabu although doing so comes at a cost of potentially damaging Nelson himself.

Amulet of Anubis
The amulet affords several powers for Nelson, including mind control, resistance to psychic/astral probing, and bolstering of his magical power. The amulet also allows the wearer to call upon and communicate with the spirits of the deceased.  

Cloak of Destiny
A magical cloak with mystic properties that make it fireproof.

Other artifacts
 Orb of Nabu''': An orb-like device used by Nelson during his time as Doctor Fate to search for unknown threats, functioning similarly to a scrying glass. Despite Doctor Fate's association with magic, it is one of the few devices he uses that is not explicitly magical; the crystals that make up the orb are considered radio sensitive and react to his brain when in use. Though technological in nature, Doctor Fate often uses it and his magic to discern what is being hidden from them.

Weaknesses and costs
While powerful, separation from the Helmet of Fate significantly weakens Nelson, as he typically possess only a level of invulnerability, telekinesis, and flight. He is also still vulnerable to human weaknesses such as gas attacks and needing to breathe without the assistance of the helm's magic. In his more recent versions, his spell-casting and magical abilities are portrayed more formidable without the helm as he can still draw power from it. However, he does not have full access to the helm's power without it in his possession.

Additionally, his incarnation of Doctor Fate is bound by the "rules of magic", making him unable to cast counter-spells against himself to nullify another spell after they've been cast, being only able to use his powers to protect him from the effects of whatever spell has been cast afterwards.

Other versions
Earth-2
After Mister Mind "eats" aspects of the fifty-two realities that make up the Multiverse, one of them, designated Earth-2, takes on visual aspects similar to the pre-Crisis Earth-Two, such as the Justice Society of America being this world's premier superteam.

This version of Doctor Fate (based upon the Kent Nelson version of the character) along with the Spectre, suspects something is awry with Power Girl's mysterious reappearance.

Flashpoint
In the alternate timeline of the Flashpoint event, Kent Nelson works as a fortune teller in Haley's Circus. Kent tells his co-worker, trapeze artist Boston Brand, of his vision of Dick Grayson's death. The circus is then attacked by Amazons who are looking to steal the helmet. Kent is impaled and killed by an Amazon before the circus workers escape with the help of Resistance member Vertigo. With Boston's help, Dick escapes the Amazons' slaughter of the other circus workers and meets up with the Resistance, using the helmet as the new Doctor Fate.

Earth-20
An alternate version of Doctor Fate, known as Doc Fate, is shown to exist on the pulp fiction-influenced world of Earth-20.Final Crisis: Secret Files #1 (February 2009). DC Comics. Doc Fate is an African-American gunslinger and occultist named Kent Nelson who is based in a windowless Manhattan skyscraper. Doc Fate forms and leads a team of adventurers known as the Society of Super-Heroes, which includes the Immortal Man, the Mighty Atom, the Blackhawks and the Green Lantern Abin Sur.

In other media

Television
 
 Kent Nelson / Doctor Fate appears in series set in the DC Animated Universe. This version is a retired superhero and former ally of Superman who was disillusioned by his never-ending battles against evil.
 Doctor Fate first appears in the Superman: The Animated Series episode "The Hand of Fate", voiced by George DelHoyo. After initially refusing to aid Superman against his enemy Karkull, Fate changes his mind after seeing Superman head off to battle him despite knowing he will almost certainly die and helps Superman seal Karkull. Despite sustaining injuries, Fate vows to continue being a hero.
 Doctor Fate makes further appearances in Justice League and Justice League Unlimited, voiced by Oded Fehr. As of the latter series, he has joined the Justice League. Additionally, Inza Nelson appears in the Justice League episode "Hereafter".
 Kent Nelson / Doctor Fate and Inza Nelson both appear in the Smallville two-part episode "Absolute Justice", portrayed by Brent Stait and Erica Carroll respectively. This version of Kent is a member of the Justice Society of America who primarily operated in the 1970s. In the present, he meets with Hawkman and Stargirl after Icicle II kills fellow JSA members Sylvester Pemberton and Sandman. Fate also restores Martian Manhunter's powers, but is later killed by Icicle II, who steals the Helmet of Fate from him.
 Kent Nelson / Doctor Fate appears in the Batman: The Brave and the Bold, voiced by Greg Ellis. This version is a member of an aged Justice Society of America.
 Kent Nelson / Doctor Fate appears in Young Justice, voiced by Ed Asner, with Nabu voiced by Kevin Michael Richardson. This version is a retired member of the Justice Society of America and mentor to Zatara. After he dies in a conflict between the Team and Klarion the Witch Boy, the Helmet of Fate is stored within Mt. Justice. Over the course of the series, the helmet is temporarily taken up by Wally West in "Denial" and Aqualad in "Revelation". In both instances, Nelson's spirit, choosing to reside in the helmet a while longer, convinces Nabu to release the host. However, in "Misplaced", after Zatanna dons the helmet to stop Klarion, Nabu refuses to release her due to the belief that the world needs Fate to protect the world against chaos until Zatara offers to become Nabu's host in her place.
 Kent Nelson / Doctor Fate appears in the Justice League Action episode "Trick or Threat", voiced by Erica Luttrell as a child. Klarion the Witch Boy turns Fate, Batman, John Constantine, and Zatanna into children so that he can lure them into the House of Mystery and steal the Helmet of Fate.
 Kent Nelson / Doctor Fate appears in Stargirl as a member of the Justice Society of America who was killed by the Injustice Society.

Film

 Kent Nelson / Doctor Fate appears in the opening credits of Justice League: The New Frontier. This version is a member of the Justice Society of America.
 A variation of Kent Nelson / Doctor Fate appears in Justice Society: World War II, voiced by Keith Ferguson. This version is a codebreaker from Earth-2 who assists the Justice Society of America in stopping the Nazis.
 Kent Nelson / Doctor Fate appears in Black Adam, portrayed by Pierce Brosnan. This version is a member of the Justice Society.

Video games
 Doctor Fate appears as an NPC, later a playable DLC character, in DC Universe Online.
 Doctor Fate appears as a summonable character in Scribblenauts Unmasked: A DC Comics Adventure.
 Kent Nelson / Doctor Fate appears as a playable character in Lego Batman 3: Beyond Gotham.
 Kent Nelson / Doctor Fate appears as a playable character in Injustice 2, voiced by David Sobolov. In the story mode, Fate confronts Green Arrow and Black Canary, but they remove the Helmet of Fate, allowing Nelson to regain control and warn them of an incoming threat to Earth. However, the Lords of Order force him to put the helmet back on and confront Superman and Batman on Brainiac's ship to ensure Brainiac's attack succeeds as it will restore order to the planet. After Superman and Batman defeat Fate, the former destroys the helmet, severing Kent's connection to the Lords of Order. He attempts to warn them to end their feud, but Brainiac kills him. In his non-canonical single-player ending, Kent defeats Brainiac, but angers the Lords of Order. Taking shelter in the House of Mystery, he is delighted to find his wife Inza Nelson was resurrected by John Constantine's daughter Rose.
 Kent Nelson / Doctor Fate appears as a playable character in Lego DC Super-Villains''.

References

External links

 
 Grand Comics Database: Doctor Fate entries
 Showcase #55: The Glory of Murphy Anderson

Characters created by Gardner Fox
Characters created by James Robinson
Characters created by J. M. DeMatteis
Characters created by Steve Gerber
Comics characters introduced in 1940
DC Comics American superheroes
DC Comics characters who use magic
DC Comics characters who can teleport
DC Comics characters with accelerated healing
DC Comics characters with superhuman strength
DC Comics male superheroes
DC Comics fantasy characters
DC Comics martial artists
DC Comics military personnel
DC Comics titles
DC Comics characters who have mental powers
DC Comics telekinetics
DC Comics telepaths
Earth-Two
Fictional archaeologists
Fictional characters who can turn invisible
Fictional characters with dimensional travel abilities
Fictional characters with healing abilities
Fictional characters with elemental and environmental abilities
Fictional characters with fire or heat abilities
Fictional characters with air or wind abilities
Fictional characters with earth or stone abilities
Fictional characters with water abilities
Fictional characters with electric or magnetic abilities
Fictional characters with immortality
Golden Age superheroes
Mythology in DC Comics
Fictional characters from Massachusetts
Fictional Scottish people
Fictional American physicians
Doctor Fate